Howmeh-ye Gharbi Rural District is a rural district (dehestan) in the Central District of Khorramshahr County, Khuzestan Province, Iran. At the 2006 census, its population was 10,567, in 2,176 families.  The rural district has 9 villages.

References 

Rural Districts of Khuzestan Province
Khorramshahr County